Masis Hambarsounian (born 3 June 1951) is a retired Iranian Armenian light-heavyweight boxer who won a gold medal at the 1974 Asian Games.

References

Living people
1951 births
Iranian people of Armenian descent
Ethnic Armenian sportspeople
Asian Games medalists in boxing
Boxers at the 1974 Asian Games
Asian Games gold medalists for Iran
Iranian male boxers
Sportspeople from Isfahan
Medalists at the 1974 Asian Games
Light-heavyweight boxers